William Henry Luden (March 5, 1859 in Reading, Pennsylvania – May 8, 1949 in Atlantic City, New Jersey) was the developer of the menthol cough drop, and founder of the Luden's company and brand.

Luden launched a backroom candy business in 1879  in the rear of his father's jewelry shop at 35 N. 5th St. in Reading, Pennsylvania, his "factory" was his family's  kitchen.  An early product was "moshie," a Pennsylvania Dutch (German-American) candy made with brown sugar and molasses.

Luden collaborated with a pharmacist to develop a cough drop formula. He colored his cough drops amber instead of the  red associated with cough drops at the time.  In 1881, Luden's honey-licorice menthol throat drops were introduced.  "Luden's Menthol Cough Drops" were sold for many years in 5-cent packages.

Menthol cough drops replaced the cumbersome vials of menthol that cold sufferers had carried to relieve their symptoms. Luden introduced new packaging methods as well, lining boxes with wax paper to extend shelf life.  Perhaps his most remarkable innovation was to give samples to railroad workers, giving the product effectively national exposure in an early example of guerilla marketing.

In 1882, he moved his operations to 37 N. 5th St., and offered an extensive line, including cough drops, hard and soft candies, chocolates and marshmallow products.  Luden manufactured his own chocolate for his candies unlike many confectioners of the time. In 1892 Luden moved his operations to a larger building at Sixth and Washington streets in Reading.

In 1900, he moved to still larger quarters on Eighth street beyond Walnut, where he erected a four-story brick  building, expanded in 1909.

William Luden retired in 1927.

In 1928, the company was acquired by Food Industries of Philadelphia, a holding company owned by the Dietrich family. Later Luden sold his company for 6.5 million dollars.  The Luden's brand has subsequently transferred ownership several times.

William Luden, age 90, died May 8, 1949, of a heart attack in Atlantic City, New Jersey, U.S.  He is buried at West Laurel Hill Cemetery in Bala Cynwyd, Pennsylvania.

References

1859 births
1949 deaths
People from Reading, Pennsylvania
Luden, William B.